The 1st Lusophone Games were held in the Macau Special Administrative Region of the People's Republic of China between 7 and 15 October 2006. The 2006 Games were the first edition of this multi-sport event for Portuguese-speaking countries and territories, under the banner of ACOLOP.

The site for the opening ceremony was the Macau Stadium and the closing ceremony was held at the Macau East Asian Games Dome. The mascot for the games was a dog named Leo. The pronunciation of "Leo" in Portuguese is similar to Chinese (Lei O) and it means "Come to Macau".

Due to the high expenses, some of the participating NOCs received financial support from the International Olympic Committee and Olympic Committee of Portugal.

Sports

The 2006 Lusophone Games included 8 sports, 3 individual sports and 5 team sports. In total there were 48 events at the Games.

 (men)
 (men)
 (men)

Delegations
A total of 733 athletes competed at the Games.

When the Games started  didn't field any athletes.

Medal table

Calendar

|-
|bgcolor=#00cc33|   ●   ||Opening ceremony|| bgcolor=#3399ff|   ●   ||Event competitions || bgcolor=#ffcc00|   ●   ||Event finals||bgcolor=#ee3333|   ●   ||Closing ceremony

|-
! October !! 4th
! 5th
! 6th
! 7th
! 8th
! 9th
! 10th
! 11th
! 12th
! 13th
! 14th
! 15th
|-
| Ceremonies || || || || bgcolor="#00cc33" align="center" | ● || || || || || || || || bgcolor="#ee3333" align="center" | ●
|-
| Athletics || || || || || || || || bgcolor="#ffcc00" align="center" | ● || bgcolor="#ffcc00" align="center" | ● || || ||
|-
| Basketball || || || || || bgcolor="#3399ff" align="center" | ● || bgcolor="#3399ff" align="center" | ● || bgcolor="#3399ff" align="center" | ● || bgcolor="#3399ff" align="center" | ● || bgcolor="#3399ff" align="center" | ● || bgcolor="#3399ff" align="center" | ● || bgcolor="#3399ff" align="center" | ● || bgcolor="#ffcc00" align="center" | ●
|-
| Beach volleyball || || || || || || || || || || bgcolor="#3399ff" align="center" | ● || bgcolor="#3399ff" align="center" | ● || bgcolor="#ffcc00" align="center" | ●
|-
| Football || bgcolor="#3399ff" align="center" | ● || bgcolor="#3399ff" align="center" | ● || bgcolor="#3399ff" align="center" | ● || || bgcolor="#3399ff" align="center" | ● || || bgcolor="#ffcc00" align="center" | ● || || || ||
|-
| Futsal || || || || || || bgcolor="#3399ff" align="center" | ● || bgcolor="#3399ff" align="center" | ● || bgcolor="#3399ff" align="center" | ● || || bgcolor="#3399ff" align="center" | ● || bgcolor="#ffcc00" align="center" | ● ||
|-
| Taekwondo || || || || || bgcolor="#ffcc00" align="center" | ● || bgcolor="#ffcc00" align="center" | ● || || || || || ||
|-
| Table tennis || || || || || || bgcolor="#3399ff" align="center" | ● || bgcolor="#ffcc00" align="center" | ● || bgcolor="#ffcc00" align="center" | ● || || || ||
|-
| Volleyball || || || || bgcolor="#3399ff" align="center" | ● || bgcolor="#3399ff" align="center" | ● || bgcolor="#3399ff" align="center" | ● || || bgcolor="#ffcc00" align="center" | ● || || || ||
|-
! October !! 4th
! 5th
! 6th
! 7th
! 8th
! 9th
! 10th
! 11th
! 12th
! 13th
! 14th
! 15th

Venues
IPM Multisport Pavilion (Pavilhão Polidesportivo do IPM)
Tap Seac Multi-sports Pavilion (Pavilhão Polidesportivo Tap Seac)
Macau Stadium Pavilion (Pavilhão Desportivo do Estádio de Macau)
Macau Stadium (Estádio de Macau)
Sports Field and Pavilion at MUST (Campo Desportivo e Pavilhão da UCTM)
Macau East Asian Games Dome (Nave Desportiva dos Jogos da Ásia Oriental de Macau)
Tennis Academy (Academia de Ténis)

See also
ACOLOP
Lusophone Games
2009 Lusophone Games
2014 Lusophone Games

References

External links
Official website of the 1st Lusophone Games

 
2006
Lusofonia Games
Lusophonia Games
International sports competitions hosted by Macau
Multi-sport events in Macau